The 2008 Appalachian State Mountaineers football team represented Appalachian State University in the 2008 NCAA Division I FCS football season. It was the 79th season of play for the Mountaineers. The team was led by Jerry Moore, the 2006 Eddie Robinson Award winner for Coach of the Year. It was his 20th season as head coach. The Mountaineers played their home games at Kidd Brewer Stadium in Boone, North Carolina.

Appalachian completed a perfect Southern Conference season at 8–0, and became just the fourth football program in conference history to win four straight conference titles. A quarterfinal playoff loss to the Richmond Spiders ended Appalachian's season, the quest for four consecutive national titles, and snapped the Mountaineers' record string of consecutive playoff victories at 13. Ending the season on a positive note was quarterback Armanti Edwards, who was honored with the Walter Payton Award, given annually to the Division I FCS most outstanding offensive player.

Schedule

Game summaries

LSU

Jacksonville

James Madison

Presbyterian

The Citadel

Samford

Georgia Southern

Furman

Wofford

Chattanooga

Elon

Western Carolina

South Carolina State

Richmond

Roster

Coaching staff

Coach profiles at GoASU

Rankings

Awards and honors
 Walter Payton Award — Armanti Edwards
 Southern Conference Coach of the Year (coaches and media) — Jerry Moore
 Southern Conference Roy M. "Legs" Hawley Offensive Player of the Year (media) — Armanti Edwards
 Southern Conference Offensive Player of the Year (coaches) — Armanti Edwards
 Southern Conference Defensive Player of the Year (coaches) — Jacque Roman

Statistics

Team

Scores by quarter

Offense

Rushing

Passing

Receiving

Defense

Special teams

2008 statistics at GoASU

References

Appalachian State
Appalachian State Mountaineers football seasons
Southern Conference football champion seasons
Appalachian State Mountaineers football